The Sony α330 (a.k.a. Sony DSLR-A330) is a 10.2 megapixel entry-level digital single-lens reflex camera released by Sony in 2009.

References

External links

330